The Apostolic Vicariate of Trinidad in the Catholic Church is located in the town of Trinidad, Casanare in Colombia.

History
On 29 October 1999 Blessed John Paul II established the Apostolic Vicariate of Trinidad from the suppressed Apostolic Vicariate of Casanare.

Ordinaries
Héctor Javier Pizarro Acevedo, O.A.R. (23 Oct 2000 – present)

See also
Roman Catholicism in Colombia

Sources

Apostolic vicariates
Roman Catholic dioceses in Colombia
Christian organizations established in 1999
1999 establishments in Colombia